Whitbybird was a privately owned structural engineering consultancy, founded in 1984 by Mark Whitby and Bryn Bird. It was initially named Whitby and Bird, then Whitby Bird & Partners and finally Whitbybird. The practice was joined in 1984 by Mike Crane and shortly afterward Tony Greatorex who were to form the core partnership until they incorporated in October 2000. In 2005 they had 300 staff members, six offices in the UK and one in Dubai.

In 2004 they won 30 awards from the Royal Institute of British Architects (including London Building of the Year), the Royal Institution of Chartered Surveyors, the Royal Fine Art Commission, the Civic Trust, the British Council for Offices

, and others. In 2006 it won a Queen's Award for Enterprise for innovation. 

The practice merged with the Nordic consultancy Ramboll (an engineering, design and consultancy company founded in Denmark in 1945) in August 2007 becoming Ramboll Whitbybird. In 2008 they were ranked 26th in The Sunday Times 100 Best Companies to Work For. 

In 2009 the practice was re-branded Ramboll UK. Mark Whitby and Mike Crane are no longer in their old positions as chairman and chief executive.

References

Engineering consulting firms of the United Kingdom
British companies established in 1984
Construction and civil engineering companies established in 1984
Consulting firms established in 1984